YInMn Blue (/jɪnmɪn/; for the chemical symbols Y for yttrium, In for indium, and Mn for manganese), also known as Oregon Blue or Mas Blue, is an inorganic blue pigment that was discovered by Mas Subramanian and his (then) graduate student, Andrew Smith, at Oregon State University in 2009. The pigment is noteworthy for its vibrant, near-perfect blue color and unusually high NIR reflectance. The chemical compound has a unique crystal structure in which trivalent manganese ions in the trigonal bipyramidal coordination are responsible for the observed intense blue color. Since the initial discovery, the fundamental principles of colour science have been explored extensively by the Subramanian research team at Oregon State University, resulting in a wide range of rationally designed novel green, purple, and orange pigments, all through intentional addition of a chromophore in the trigonal bipyramidal coordination environment.

Historical pigments 
The discovery of the first known synthetic blue pigment, Egyptian blue was promoted by the Egyptian pharaohs who sponsored the creation of new pigments to be used in art. Other civilizations combined organic and mineral materials to create blue pigments ranging from azure-blue like the Maya blue to the Han blue, which was developed by the Chinese Han dynasty and manipulated to produce a light or dark blue color.

Currently, a number of pigments are used to impart the blue color. Cobalt blue was first described in 1777; it is extremely stable and has been traditionally used as a coloring agent in ceramics. Ultramarine was made by grinding the forbiddingly expensive lapis lazuli into a powder until a cheaper synthetic form was invented in 1826 by the French industrialist Jean Baptiste Guimet and in 1828 by the German chemist Christian Gmelin. Prussian blue was first described by the German polymath Johann Leonhard Frisch and the president of the Prussian Academy of Sciences, Gottfried Wilhelm Leibniz, in 1708. Azurite is a soft, deep-blue copper mineral produced by weathering copper ore deposits; it was used since ancient times and was first recorded by the first century Roman writer Pliny the Elder. Phthalocyanine Blue BN was first prepared in 1927 and has wide range of applications.

Most known pigments have detrimental health and environmental effects and/or durability issues. Cobalt blue causes cobalt poisoning when inhaled or ingested. Prussian blue is known to liberate hydrogen cyanide under certain acidic conditions. Ultramarine and azurite are not stable particularly in high-temperature and acidic conditions; additionally, ultramarine production involves the emission of a large amount of the toxic sulfur dioxide. The newer Phthalocyanine Blue BN is non-biodegradable and has been found to cause neuroanatomical defects in developing chicken embryos when injected directly into incubating eggs.

Inorganic blue pigments in which manganese (in the pentavalent oxidation state and in a tetrahedral coordination) is the chromophore have been employed since the Middle Ages (e.g., the fossil bone odontolite, which is isostructural to the apatite structure). Synthetic alternatives, such as barium manganate sulfate (or Manganese Blue, developed in 1907 and patented in 1935), have been phased out industrially due to safety and regulatory concerns, hence YInMn Blue fills the niche of an inorganic, environmentally safe alternative to the traditionally used blue pigments, and offers a durable intense blue color.

Discovery
In 2008, Subramanian received a National Science Foundation grant to explore novel materials for electronics applications. Under this project, he was particularly interested in synthesizing multiferroics based on manganese oxides. The resulting compound Smith synthesized was by coincidence a vibrant blue material. Because of Subramanian's experience at DuPont, he recognized the compound's potential use as a blue pigment and together they filed a patent disclosure covering the invention. After publishing their results, Shepherd Color Company successfully contacted Subramanian for possible collaboration in commercialization efforts. For his outstanding contributions to inorganic color pigment chemistry, Subramanian was awarded the Perkin Medal from the Society of Dyers and Colourists in 2019.

The pigment is noteworthy for its vibrant, near-perfect blue color and unusually high NIR reflectance.

Properties and preparation
YInMn Blue is chemically stable, does not fade, and is non-toxic. It is more durable than alternative blue pigments such as ultramarine or Prussian blue, retaining its vibrant color in oil and water, and is safer than cobalt blue, which is a suspected carcinogen and may cause cobalt poisoning. 

The pigment is resistant to acids such as nitric acid, and is difficult to combust. When YInMn Blue does ignite, it burns a violet color attributed to the indium atoms.

Infrared radiation is strongly reflected by YInMn Blue, which makes this pigment suitable for energy-saving, cool coatings.

Commercialization

In popular culture 
After Subramanian, Smith, and other colleagues published their results, companies began inquiring about commercial uses. Shepherd Color Company eventually won the license to commercialize the pigment in May 2015. Many companies such as AMD and Crayola rushed to use the new pigment name in product announcements and press releases. It is unclear when the first commercial application of YInMn blue reached the consumer market.

AMD announced in July 2016 that the pigment would be used on new Radeon Pro WX and Pro SSG professional GPUs for the energy efficiency that stems from its near-infrared reflecting property.

The American art supplies company Crayola announced in May 2017 that it planned to replace its retired Dandelion color (a yellow) with a new color "inspired by" YInMn. The new color does not contain any YInMn. Crayola held a contest for more pronounceable name ideas, and announced the new color name, "Bluetiful", on 14 September 2017. The new crayon color has been available since late 2017.

In artists' pigments 
In June 2016, an Australian company, Derivan, published experiments using YInMn within their artist range (Matisse acrylics), and subsequently released the pigment for purchase.

As of April 2021, Golden Paints has commercially licensed and sourced the pigment from Shepherd Color Company. According to Golden, the supply of the raw pigment is extremely limited. Shephard Color Company received the required environmental and safety approvals to sell the pigment in the U.S. in 2020.

See also
 International Klein Blue
 List of inorganic pigments

Notes

References

External links
 United States patent 8282728: "Materials with trigonal bipyramidal coordination and methods of making the same"
 YInMn Blue at Shepherd Color Company
 Medal for YInMnBlue and Dr. Mas Subramanian

Shades of blue
Yttrium compounds
Indium compounds
Manganese(III) compounds
Transition metal oxides
Inorganic pigments